Reginald Carter (1868-1936) was a Fellow and Tutor of Lincoln College, Oxford, Rector of the Edinburgh Academy, and Headmaster of Bedford School.

Biography

Born in Truro, Cornwall, on 12 January 1868, Reginald Carter was educated at Clifton College,  at Balliol College, Oxford, and at Lincoln College, Oxford, where he was Tutor in Classics and elected as a Fellow in 1893. He was Rector of the Edinburgh Academy, between 1902 and 1910, and Headmaster of Bedford School, between 1910 and 1928.

Reginald Carter died on 20 August 1936.

References

1868 births
1936 deaths
People educated at Clifton College
Alumni of Balliol College, Oxford
Alumni of Lincoln College, Oxford
Fellows of Lincoln College, Oxford
Headmasters of Bedford School
Schoolteachers from Cornwall